Laurie Smith (born June 21, 1952) was the 28th Sheriff of Santa Clara County, California, serving from 1998 until her early retirement in 2022 when under indictment for corruption. She was the first female County Sheriff in the history of the state.

Early life and education
Laurie Smith is a native of Michigan, where she lived until completion of high school. In 1969 she relocated to San Jose, California, for college and to begin her law enforcement career. Smith has a bachelor's degree in Administration of Justice from San Jose State University and a master's degree in Business Management from California State Polytechnic University, Pomona. She is a graduate of the California Command College and of the FBI National Academy and National Executive Institute.

Santa Clara County Sheriff's Office

Deputy Sheriff: 1973–1998
Smith began her career at the Sheriff's Office in 1973, working as a matron (the former title for a female Sheriff's Deputy) at the Santa Clara County Jail until 1976. She then became one of the first female permanent undercover vice cops. In three years in this position, she posed as a prostitute, a vendor of stolen goods, and a drug user. She next worked in the patrol division, then became a watch commander over the jails.

Assistant Sheriff: 1990–1998
In 1990, Sheriff Chuck Gillingham promoted her to Assistant Sheriff. (At the time, Gillingham was criticized for promoting Smith and two others over other candidates of higher rank, in particular for changing the job description to make a sergeant, her rank at the time, eligible for the post of Assistant Sheriff.) In 1992, a male deputy filed an internal complaint against Smith after being transferred out of the narcotics unit while a female deputy with less seniority was allowed to remain. Smith stated that it was not her decision. The same deputy later filed a sexual harassment complaint against Smith, but she was found innocent.

Sheriff: 1998–2022 
After eight years as Assistant, Smith was elected Sheriff of Santa Clara County on November 3, 1998 by a substantial margin and took office on December 15, 1998, becoming the first female sheriff in California.

1998–2010 
After Santa Clara County District Attorney Dolores Carr made a controversial decision not to prosecute on grounds of insufficient evidence in an alleged rape of a 17-year-old in San Jose in March 2007, Sheriff Smith declared the case "still open" and that she believed a sexual assault did occur. Carr submitted the case to the Office of the State Attorney General for review.

Fourth term: 2010–2014 
In 2010, Metro Silicon Valley credited Smith with putting the sheriff's office on a sound and efficient basis. She was re-elected in 2010.

A lawsuit in 2011 claimed that Smith issues concealed carry permits preferentially to friends and donors.

In 2012, there was controversy over Smith's assigning a bodyguard to Santa Clara County Supervisor George Shirakawa, Jr., who was ultimately convicted of misuse of funds and other crimes. The bodyguard was a family friend of Shirakawa's whose brother was a political advisor, and was reassigned by the Sheriff's Office after criticism.

Fifth term: 2014–2018 
In June 2014 Smith won election for a fifth term against retired Sheriff's Captain Kevin Jensen, who had been endorsed by the Santa Clara County Deputy Sheriffs' Association and the Santa Clara County Correctional Peace Officers' Association.

On August 27, 2015, mentally-ill inmate Michael Tyree was beaten to death by three jail guards who were convicted of second-degree murder in 2017.

Two inmates escaped from custody in San Jose in November 2016. Two inmates escaped from custody in Palo Alto in November 2017.

On June 5, 2018, Smith ran for re-election to her sixth term against five challengers including former undersheriff John Hirokawa and Deputy Joseph LaJeunesse. The results required the first run-off of her career, against Hirokawa, on November 6, 2018; Smith was re-elected.

Sixth term: 2018–2022 
In 2019, The Mercury News and affiliates uncovered evidence that CCW permits may have been issued in a "pay-for-play" fashion to those who donated money to her campaign reelection funds. The Santa Clara County DA opened an investigation and on August 7, 2020, four individuals, including Capt. James Jensen, were indicted by a grand jury. On November 20, 2020, Undersheriff Rick Sung was also indicted. On December 14, 2021, Smith was indicted by a Santa Clara County civil grand jury on seven counts of corruption and misconduct.

On March 10, 2022, Smith announced that she would retire at the end of her term in January 2023. She retired on October 31, 2022, before the end of jury deliberations in her public corruption trial, and filed a motion to have the charges dropped, which was denied. In early November, a special civil jury found Smith guilty of all charges of corruption and willful misconduct.

Organizations 
, Smith has been on the Salvation Army Board of Directors, a member of Rotary International, a member of the Advisory Board at the University of San Francisco, and a member of the Administration of Justice Program Advisory Board at De Anza College. She is part of the National Sheriffs' Association, and participates in half a dozen regional and international law enforcement groups (in particular she was President of the California State Sheriffs' Association in 2007–08 and is on the President's Council ) as well as a dozen local groups.

References

External links 
 Sheriff Laurie Smith at Santa Clara County Office of the Sheriff
 Personal website

1952 births
Living people
American women police officers
California Republicans
California sheriffs
People from Lansing, Michigan
People from Santa Clara County, California
San Jose State University alumni
Women sheriffs
21st-century American women